Marc Castells Ortega (born 12 March 1990) is a Spanish professional footballer who plays as a defensive midfielder for UE Olot.

His older brother, Cristian, was also a footballer.

References

External links

1990 births
Living people
People from Ribera Baixa
Sportspeople from the Province of Valencia
Spanish footballers
Footballers from the Valencian Community
Association football midfielders
Segunda División players
Segunda División B players
Tercera División players
Primera Federación players
Segunda Federación players
Valencia CF Mestalla footballers
Polideportivo Ejido footballers
Real Oviedo players
CD Castellón footballers
CE L'Hospitalet players
Linares Deportivo footballers
UE Olot players
Super League Greece players
Asteras Tripolis F.C. players
Athlitiki Enosi Larissa F.C. players
Ukrainian Premier League players
FC Zirka Kropyvnytskyi players
Spanish expatriate footballers
Expatriate footballers in Greece
Expatriate footballers in Ukraine
Spanish expatriate sportspeople in Greece
Spanish expatriate sportspeople in Ukraine